Austro Control (German: Österreichische Gesellschaft für Zivilluftfahrt) is the air navigation services provider that controls Austrian airspace. Its location and jurisdiction is Vienna, with the physical offices also being located in Vienna. Austro Control is a member of the Civil Air Navigation Services Organisation (CANSO).

References

External links
 Austro Control 
 Austro Control 

Aviation in Austria
Civil aviation authorities in Europe
Air navigation service providers
Transport organisations based in Austria
Organisations based in Vienna